The Samsung SCH-u700/u550 (more commonly known as the Samsung Gleam) is a 3G EV-DO mobile phone available in the United States. Phone features include Bluetooth, MP3 player, video player, recording and messaging. It comes in black with blue, gold, and purple sides.

Messaging
The Samsung SCH-U700 contains many types of messaging features, including SMS, EMS, and MMS. This phone also has support for E-mail and instant messaging (IM). The IM services that the phone supports are AOL Instant Messenger, Windows Live Messenger, and Yahoo! Messenger. The SCH-U700 device contains the Mobile IM Version 2.0.1.34.

Connectivity
The Samsung SCH-U700 contains Bluetooth connectivity. The phone can connect to a computer through a USB cable. It can also connect through Wireless Application Protocol (WAP) and it contains an HTML version of an Internet Browser.

Important features and applications

Personal information management
This phone contains features to manage personal information. These features include a calendar, a scheduler, a to-do list and an alarm. The contacts list in this phone can hold up to 500 entries.

Tools
The Samsung SCH-U700 contains other features, such as a world time clock, a unit converter, a currency converter, a calculator, a notepad, and a stop watch.

Other features
This phone contains a music player, a music library, a video wallpaper, video Messaging, video Recording, video playing, mobile printing, voice memos and voice mails, speakerphone, voice commands, and external memory. External memory can be inserted in the phone through a microSD card.

Reception 
Kent German of CNET gave the SCH-u550 variant 3 out of 5 stars, positively noting its 3G and stereo Bluetooth support but panning its "dull" design, "poorly designed" media controls and "disappointing" multimedia experience stating in the bottom line "The Samsung SCH-U550 doesn't offer the performance or design that we'd expect from a 3G Verizon Wireless cell phone." PhoneArena was a little more positive, giving the u550 a 7 out of 10, praising its "excellent call quality" its support for microSDHC cards up to 8GB and its customizable themes, but deriding the phone's  "small" external display, mono speaker and the WAP browser that, according to them, "has problems displaying large HTML sites".

The SCH-u700 variant was more positively received with CNET giving it 3.5 out of 5 stars citing its attractive design, gorgeous internal display and good call and music quality but negatively mentioning its "average" call and video quality, its speakerphone and voice dialing which "don't fare well in noisy environments".

See also
 Samsung Electronics
 Verizon Wireless

References

External links
 Samsung SGH-U700 tech specs — official webpage
Samsung Gleams with Verizon Wireless, CNET News, October 5, 2007
 HOWTO: Samsung Gleam (SCH-u700) Ringtone Unlock

U700
Mobile phones introduced in 2007